Rosbach is a railway station on the Sieg Railway, situated at Windeck, Rhein-Sieg-Kreis in western Germany. The station building was built between 1880 and 1897 on a section of the Sieg Railway that was opened by the Cologne-Minden Railway Company (CME) between Eitorf and Wissen on 1 August 1861. It has two platform tracks and is classified by Deutsche Bahn as a category 6 station.

It is served by S-Bahn S 12 services from Köln-Ehrenfeld (Horrem in the peak) to Au (Sieg) and on weekends by S19 services from Düren to Au (Sieg). The S12 services operate hourly, but the S19 services are less frequent.

References 

S12 (Rhine-Ruhr S-Bahn)
Rhine-Ruhr S-Bahn stations
Buildings and structures in Rhein-Sieg-Kreis
Railway stations in Germany opened in 1880